Mordellistena columbretensis is a beetle in the genus Mordellistena of the family Mordellidae. It was described in 1970 by Compte.

References

columbretensis
Beetles described in 1970
Endemic fauna of the Balearic Islands